Walter Keil Granger (October 11, 1888 – April 21, 1978) was a U.S. Representative from Utah.

Born in St. George in the Utah Territory, Granger moved with his parents to Cedar City, in 1894. He attended the public schools and graduated from Branch Agricultural College at Cedar City, Utah in 1909. From 1909 to 1911 Granger served as an LDS missionary in the Southern States Mission.

Granger served as postmaster of Cedar City from 1914 to 1922. During this time he served overseas as a sergeant in the Eleventh Regiment of the United States Marine Corps from 1918 to 1919, which saw no combat in the waning days of World War I. He later twice served as mayor of Cedar City from 1923 to 1926 and 1930 to 1932. From 1926 until at least 1930 Granger was also the LDS Bishop of the Cedar 3rd Ward in Ceder City.

Advancing his political career, Granger served as member of the Utah House of Representatives from 1932 to 1937, and serving as speaker in 1935. He then served as member of the Public Service Commission of Utah from 1937 to 1940. In 1941 Granger was elected as a Democrat to the Seventy-seventh and to the five succeeding Congresses (January 3, 1941 to January 3, 1953). He was not a candidate for reelection in 1952 but was an unsuccessful candidate for election to the United States Senate. In 1954 he was again an unsuccessful candidate, in the election to the 84th United States Congress.

Granger was engaged in agricultural pursuits and livestock raising and served as member of the board of trustees of Utah State Agricultural College. After his political life he resumed his farming interests and from 1967 to 1970 served as member of the Board of Appeals of the United States Forest Service in the Department of Agriculture.

After retiring, he resided again in Cedar City, where he died April 21, 1978, at the age of 89. He was interred in Cedar City Cemetery.

Sources

References

1888 births
1978 deaths
20th-century Mormon missionaries
American leaders of the Church of Jesus Christ of Latter-day Saints
American Mormon missionaries in the United States
Mayors of places in Utah
Democratic Party members of the Utah House of Representatives
People from Cedar City, Utah
People from St. George, Utah
Southern Utah University alumni
Speakers of the Utah House of Representatives
United States Marines
Utah State University people
Democratic Party members of the United States House of Representatives from Utah
20th-century American politicians
Latter Day Saints from Utah